Thomas Morgan, DL, JP (died 1603) was a Welsh Member of the Parliament of England.

He was the eldest son of Sir Rowland Morgan of Machen, Monmouthshire and educated at the Middle Temple. He inherited Tredegar House from his cousin Miles Morgan, who had died at sea after inheriting it from William Morgan.

He was a Justice of the Peace for Monmouthshire from c. 1570 and appointed High Sheriff of Monmouthshire for 1580–81. He served a Deputy Lieutenant for the county from 1587 until his death. He was elected M.P. for Monmouthshire in 1588.

He married Elizabeth, the daughter of Roger Bodenham, with whom he had 9 sons and 13 daughters. he was succeeded by his son, Sir William Morgan.

See also 
Sir Thomas Morgan (MP died 1565)

References

 

1603 deaths
People from Machen
Members of the Middle Temple
English MPs 1589
Deputy Lieutenants of Monmouthshire
High Sheriffs of Monmouthshire
Year of birth unknown
Welsh justices of the peace